USS Politesse (SP-662) was a motorboat that served in the United States Navy as a patrol vessel from 1917 to 1919.
 
Politesse was built as a civilian motorboat in 1911 by J. R. Robertson at Waltham, Massachusetts, for Frederic C. Hood. In 1917, the U.S. Navy chartered her for use as a patrol boat during World War I. She was commissioned on 15 April 1917 as USS Politesse (SP-662). Apparently, her charter officially went into effect two days later, on 17 April 1917.

Politesse performed patrol duty at Boston, Massachusetts, for the remainder of World War I.

After World War I, the Navy returned Politesse to her owner.  Sources differ on the date of the return, giving it as both 29 May 1919  and 5 July 1919.

Notes

References

Department of the Navy Naval History and Heritage Command Online Library of Selected Images: Civilian Ships: Politesse (American Motor Boat, 1911). Served as USS Politesse (SP-662) in 1917-1919
NavSource Online: Section Patrol Craft Photo Archive: Politesse (SP 662)

Patrol vessels of the United States Navy
World War I patrol vessels of the United States
Ships built in Boston
1911 ships